Tongguan County (alternately romanized as Tungkwan) is a county in the east of Shaanxi province, China, administered as part of the prefecture-level city of Weinan. It is named after the Tong Pass, located south of the confluence of the Wei and Yellow Rivers. It is the southeastern corner of the Ordos Loop, the point at which the Qin Mountains turn the Yellow River sharply eastward, forcing it into the North China Plain, and borders the provinces of Shanxi to the north and Henan to the east.

Administrative divisions
Tongguan County is divided to 5 towns and 1 townships.
Towns

Townships
Anle

Climate

Notes

References

External links
 Official website

County-level divisions of Shaanxi